The Sudbury Igneous Complex is a 1,844 million year-old impact melt sheet in Greater Sudbury, Northern Ontario, Canada. It is part of the Sudbury Basin impact structure, and is classified as a lopolith.

References
Significance Of Back-To-Back Facing Directions Along The South Range Of The Sudbury Igneous Complex, Ontario 

Geology of Greater Sudbury
Igneous petrology of Ontario
Paleoproterozoic magmatism